The year 1886 in archaeology involved some significant events.

Explorations

Excavations
 October 4 - Augustus Pitt Rivers begins excavation of the Romano-British settlement site on Rotherley Down.

Finds
 September - Beothuk child burial on an island of Newfoundland.
 The well-preserved skeletons of a Neanderthal man and woman with Mousterian stone implements are found in the Betche aux Roches cavern at Spy, Belgium, by Maximin Lohest and Marcel de Puydt.
 Minaret of Jam in Afghanistan recorded by Thomas Holdich.

Events
 June 10 - Te Wairoa is buried by a volcanic eruption.

Births
 October 28 - O. G. S. Crawford, British archaeologist (d. 1957).

Deaths
 June 5 - Llewellynn Jewitt, British archaeologist, illustrator and natural scientist (b. 1816).

References

Archaeology
Archaeology by year
Archaeology
Archaeology